The IA 36 Cóndor (English: Condor) was a projected Argentine jet propelled mid-range airliner, designed in the early 1950s by Kurt Tank for the “Fábrica Militar de Aviones”. It was cancelled in 1958, with no prototypes built, but a full size wood mockup.

Design and development 
Work on the IA 36 Cóndor project started in late 1951 by a team led by the German engineer Kurt Tank; as part of the project a 1:34 scale wind tunnel model was built, as well as a 1:1 scale wooden fuselage mock-up. The project was cancelled in 1958 by the government led by Pedro Eugenio Aramburu, which followed that of Juan Domingo Perón, deposed in 1955 by the now quite infamous Revolución Libertadora uprising.

The projected aircraft would have been powered by five Rolls-Royce "Nene II" turbojets arranged in an annular configuration around the rear fuselage, as in Messerschmitt P.1110 and Heinkel He 211; however it was planned to replace those with lighter and more powerful engines in later versions.
Like the Pulqui II fighter prototype, also designed by Tank, the IA 36 had swept wings which would have increased the aerodynamic efficiency.

Specifications

See also

References

Notes

Further reading

External links

 MilitariaArg website (accessed 2016-04-21)

FMA aircraft
Abandoned civil aircraft projects
Low-wing aircraft
Cruciform tail aircraft
Five-engined jet aircraft